Lose Control is the debut album by Silk. The album went to number-one on the US Top R&B/Hip-Hop Albums chart and includes the hit single "Freak Me", which peaked at number one on the Billboard Hot 100 chart and was covered in 1998 by British band Another Level. Lose Control was certified double platinum by the RIAA in 1995.

Track listing
"Interlude" (Keith Sweat) (T.H Prod)– 1:23  
"Happy Days" (featuring Keith Sweat and rap by The Riddler) (Keith Sweat, Alton "Wokie" Stewart, Fred Wesley, James Brown, John Starks) – 5:19  
"Don't Keep Me Waiting" (featuring Gerald Levert and Sean Levert) (Keith Sweat, Alton "Wokie" Stewart) – 4:16  
"Girl U for Me" (Keith Sweat, Roy Murray, IRocc Williams) – 4:30  
"Freak Me" (Keith Sweat, Roy Murray, IRocc Williams ) featuring rap by Teno West – 4:35  
"When I Think About You" (Teno West, Gary Jenkins, Gary Glenn, Roy Murray IRocc Williams) featuring rap by Teno West – 3:55  
"Baby It's You" (Keith Sweat, IRocc Williams) – 4:05  
"Lose Control" (Keith Sweat, Roy Murray, IRocc Williams Gary Jenkins) – 5:16  
"It Had to Be You" (Keith Sweat, Roy Murray, IRocc Williams, Gary Jenkins) – 4:10  
"I Gave to You" (William Hart) – 4:49

"Happy Days" features a sample of "The Payback" by James Brown.

Personnel
Alton "Wokie" Stewart – keyboards, drum programming, backing vocals
Roy Murray, Keni Burke – keyboards, drum programming
Errol Taylor, Gary Jenkins – keyboards
iRocc Williams – drum programming

Singles
"Happy Days" (October 15, 1992)
"Freak Me" (February 18, 1993)
"Lose Control/Girl U for Me" (June 10, 1993)
"Baby It's You"
"It Had to Be You"

Charts

Certifications

See also
List of number-one R&B albums of 1993 (U.S.)

References

1992 debut albums
Elektra Records albums
Silk (group) albums